Kalyvakia may refer to several places:

In Cyprus

Kalyvakia, Cyprus

In Greece

Kalyvakia, Arcadia, a village in Arcadia 
Kalyvakia, Elis, a village in Elis 
Kalyvakia, Karditsa, a village in the Karditsa regional unit